Middle Beach may refer to different places in the world:

United States
Mid-Beach, the central section of the city of Miami Beach, Florida

Australia
Middle Beach, South Australia, a small town 40 km northwest of Adelaide
United Kingdom

 Middle Beach, Dorset, small beach on Poole Harbour, England